Bottleneck literally refers to the narrowed portion (neck) of a bottle near its opening, which limit the rate of outflow, and may describe any object of a similar shape. The literal neck of a bottle was originally used to play what is now known as slide guitar.

Metaphorically, the term may also be used as an analogy for any of the following implications of rate limitation or function restriction:

Computing
 Bottleneck (network), in communication networks using max-min fairness
 Bottleneck (software), a software component that severely affects application performance
 Internet bottleneck, when high usage slows the performance on the Internet at a particular point
 Von Neumann bottleneck, a limit of throughput between a computer's processor and memory
 Interconnect bottleneck

Geography
 Bottleneck (K2), a mountain feature near the top of K2 mountain
 Choke point, a feature that reduces passability of terrain
 Free State Bottleneck, a quasi-state that existed in Germany during the time of the Weimar Republic

Other
 Bottleneck (engineering), where the performance of an entire system is limited by a single component
 Bottleneck (production), where one process reduces capacity of the whole chain of processes
 Nocturnal bottleneck hypothesis to explain several mammal traits
 Population bottleneck, an evolutionary event that drastically reduces a population
 Traffic bottleneck, a local disruption in a transportation network
 Bottleneck, a design element of some firearms cartridge cases

See also
 Liebig's law of the minimum
 Reverse salient